Willington Athletic Football Club was an English football club based in Willington Quay, Northumberland. The team played at a ground next to Howdon railway station.

Willington Athletic joined the Northern Alliance in 1891–92, and won that league's championship for the first time in 1899–1900, repeating the feat in 1904–05, 1905–06 and 1909–10. Its team first entered the FA Cup in 1891–92they lost to Shankhouse in the second qualifying round after a replayand entered each season until competitive football was abandoned for the duration of the First World War. In 1899–1900, they reached the fifth qualifying round, in which they lost to Jarrow, also after a replay. They won the Northumberland Senior Cup in 1896 and 1897.

The club applied for election to the Football League in 1903, but received only one vote.

When the Northern Alliance resumed after the war, Willington Athletic initially intended to continue in membership, but by the time the 1919–20 season began, they had dropped out.

Honours and achievements
 Northern Alliance
 Champions: 1899–1900, 1904–05, 1905–06, 1909–10
 Northumberland Senior Cup
 Winners: 1896, 1897

References

Defunct football clubs in England
Defunct football clubs in Northumberland
Northern Football Alliance
Association football clubs established in the 19th century